Eino Eetu Kosonen (died 23 December 1953) was a Finnish gymnast who competed at the 1908 Summer Olympics.

He was part of the Viipurin Reipas team that won the gymnastics Finnish national championship in 1903, 1906 and 1912. He was nominated into their honorary legion.

Sources

References 

Finnish male artistic gymnasts
Olympic gymnasts of Finland
Gymnasts at the 1908 Summer Olympics
19th-century births
Year of birth missing
1953 deaths
20th-century Finnish people